Francesco Sciortino (born December 29, 1960) is an Italian physicist and Full Professor at Sapienza University of Rome. He has made seminal contributions to statistical physics, including the thermodynamic and dynamic theory of complex fluids like water, colloids, colloidal-polymer mixtures, patchy particles, and DNA-based materials. He is one of the original proponents of the "second liquid critical point" theory of water.

Education

Sciortino was awarded a Ph.D. in Physics from the University of Palermo in 1989 working on the coupling between biomolecules and the solvent, and focusing on the role of water's hydrogen bond cooperativity in supramolecular arrangement of biomolecules. After the Ph.D., Sciortino became Research Assistant in the Center for polymer studies of Boston University, working in the group of Prof. H. Eugene Stanley.

Academic career

Following his postdoctoral research position in Boston, in 1992 Sciortino became a researcher in Centro di Ricerca, Sviluppo e Studi Superiori in Sardegna, Cagliari. One year later he moved to Sapienza University of Rome, where he became assistant professor in 1993, associate professor in 2000, and full professor in 2005. He serves as Associate Editor of the Journal of Chemical Physics.

Research and achievements

Sciortino has made seminal contributions in the field of statistical mechanics and soft condensed matter theory. He is one of the original proponents of the Second Liquid Critical Point Hypothesis for water,. which explains water's anomalous behaviour with the presence of a hidden critical point in supercooled water. Experimental verification of this hypothesis has been obtained numerically in several models of water, and finally confirmed with scattering experiments using X-ray pulses.

Sciortino has worked extensively on the physics of arrested states of matter, making seminal contribution to Mode Coupling theory and the Potential Energy Landscape formalism. He and his collaborators hypothesised a novel type of glass (re-entrant glass) in short-range attractive colloidal systems, and this prediction was later confirmed by several experiments and numerical simulations.
Sciortino and his co-authors were also the first to identify colloidal gels as the outcome of a dynamical arrested phase separation process. His contributions to the physics of reduced valence interactions are numerous: the discovery of empty liquids, equilibrium gels, re-entrant topological transitions in network fluids, among many others

According to Scopus, Sciortino's work has been cited 27315 times, and his H-index is 89. Google Scholar lists 34831 citations and an H-index of 100. Thanks to these bibliometric indexes, he is ranked among the top 10 Italian Physicists in activity.

References

1960 births
Living people
Computational physicists
20th-century Italian physicists
21st-century Italian physicists